Zazi District, also called Jaji, Dzadzi or Aryob, is a district in Paktia Province, Afghanistan.  The main town is Aryob. The district is within the heartland of the Zazi tribe of Pashtuns.

Demographics & population
Like in the rest of Afghanistan, no exact population numbers are available. The Afghan Ministry of Rural Rehabilitation & Development (MRRD) along with UNHCR and Central Statistics Office (CSO) of Afghanistan estimated the population of Zazi district to be around 45,923 (CSO 2004). According to the same sources, but according to the local tribe estimation and counting, the total population  of Zazai() is in two district of Ahmad Khel and Aryub 375000 in 2016 (Malak Aziz Khan from Larliwani village), Pashtuns make up 100% of the total population.

See also
Aryob

References

Districts of Paktia Province